Colm O'Flaherty (born 1950) is an Irish retired Gaelic footballer who played for the Tipperary and Leitrim senior teams.

Born in Cahir, County Tipperary, O'Flaherty first arrived on the inter-county scene at the age of fifteen when he first linked up with the Tipperary minor team before later joining the under-21 side. He joined the Tipperary senior panel during the 1970 championship. O'Flaherty subsequently became a regular member of the starting fifteen.

At club level O'Flaherty is a one-time championship medallist with Fr. Griffin's. He played the majority of his club football with Cahir.

O'Flaherty retired from inter-county football following the conclusion of the 1980 championship.

In retirement from playing O'Flaherty became involved in team management and coaching. He has served as a selector, coach and manager with the Tipperary minor, under-21 and senior teams in both Gaelic football and hurling.

Honours

Player

Fr. Griffin's
Galway Senior Football Championship (1): 1970

Selector

Tipperary
National Hurling League (1): 1993-94
Munster Minor Hurling Championship (1): 1993

References

1950 births
Living people
Cahir Gaelic footballers
Cahir hurlers
Tipperary inter-county Gaelic footballers
Gaelic football managers
Gaelic football selectors
Hurling selectors